Rumours of Glory is the 2014 autobiography of Canadian musician Bruce Cockburn, written by Cockburn and journalist Greg King.

Synopsis
Alongside detailing his musical career, Cockburn discusses his activism in the fields of human rights and environmental issues, the evolution of his Christian faith, and his relationships and family. He also includes discussions of how his experiences were reflected in his song lyrics.

Publication
HarperCollins released the hardcover edition on 4 November 2014.

Reception
Maclean's review of the book noted that "[i]t's hard to imagine a more Canadian memoir". Morley Walker of the Winnipeg Free Press generally regarded Rumours of Glory as "a rewarding read, candid and erudite, even where it is a bit plodding". Brian Doyle of The Christian Century noted that Cockburn's book was one of a few "beautifully written and piercing memoirs" by musicians, adding that it was also "uniquely thoughtful and eloquent about the author's Christian faith and how it informs his life and work".

References

External links
 Rumours of Glory at HarperCollins

2014 non-fiction books
HarperCollins books
Canadian autobiographies
Music autobiographies